Andrey Sudnik (born 11 March 1967) is a retired Belarusian middle-distance runner who specialized in the 800 meters. He represented the Soviet Union at two indoor and two outdoor World Championships.

His personal bests in the event are 1:45.15 outdoors (Helsinki 1988) and 1:45.9 indoors (Moscow 1991).

Nowadays he works as a coach of the Belarusian national race walking team.

Competition record

References

All-Athletics profile

1969 births
Living people
Soviet male middle-distance runners
Belarusian male middle-distance runners
World Athletics Championships athletes for the Soviet Union
Soviet Athletics Championships winners
Competitors at the 1990 Goodwill Games